Pancreatic mucinous cystadenoma, also known as "mucinous cystadenoma of the pancreas", is a benign tumour of pancreas. It is one of the cystic lesions of the pancreas.

Pathology

Microscopy

See also 
 Mucinous cystadenoma
 Pancreatic cysts
 Pancreatic serous cystadenoma

References

Digestive system neoplasia
Pancreas